Bryan Schwartz (born December 5, 1971 in St. Lawrence, South Dakota) is a former American football linebacker in the National Football League. He was drafted by the Jacksonville Jaguars in the second round of the 1995 NFL Draft. He played college football at Augustana College. During his Senior season, Schwartz was the first Division II player nominated for the Dick Butkus Award, which goes to the nation’s best college linebacker.

In 2002, Schwartz and his wife appeared on an episode of Trading Spaces. Designer Hildi Santo Tomàs covered their wall with over 4,000 wine labels. The Schwartzes—who say they told producers that they don't allow alcohol in their home—were not impressed. They wound up taking one month and $5,000 of their own money to undo Santo Tomás's vision.

Schwartz currently resides in Ponte Vedra Beach, Fl with his wife and seven children.

He is a former pastor at Celebration Church in Jacksonville, Florida and is founder of Family Goals

References

1971 births
Living people
American football linebackers
Augustana (South Dakota) Vikings football players
Jacksonville Jaguars players
People from Hand County, South Dakota
Players of American football from South Dakota